Eleutherocaulis haroldi, known as Purcell's hunter slug or the caterpillar slug, is a species of tropical land slug in the family Veronicellidae, the leatherleaf slugs. It was first formally named Laevicaulis haroldi in 1980.

Distribution
Eleutherocaulis haroldi is native to South Africa.

Conservation status
In its home range in South Africa, Eleutherocaulis haroldi is endangered; it is threatened by habitat loss.. It has been introduced accidentally in India and is becoming an invasive pest. The species was first reported feeding and causing damage to Mulberry plants in Maharashtra. It is speculated to have reached India through various airports and international trade.

References

Endemic fauna of South Africa
Veronicellidae
Gastropods described in 1980
Taxonomy articles created by Polbot